is a very small asteroid, classified as a near-Earth object of the Apollo group, approximately  in diameter. It was first observed by astronomers of the Mount Lemmon Survey at Mount Lemmon Observatory on 29 September 2017, three days prior to its sub-lunar close encounter with Earth at 0.23 lunar distances on 2 October 2017.

Orbit and classification 

 is a member of the Apollo asteroids, which cross the orbit of Earth. Apollo's are the largest group of near-Earth objects with approximately 10 thousand known objects.

It orbits the Sun at a distance of 0.87–1.46 AU once every 15 months (459 days; semi-major axis of 1.16 AU). Its orbit has an eccentricity of 0.26 and an inclination of 3° with respect to the ecliptic.

The body's observation arc begins with an observation made by Pan-STARRS on 24 September 2017, five days prior to its official first observation.

Close approaches 

Approaches in 2017

Physical characteristics 

As of 2018, no rotational lightcurve has been obtained from photometric observations. The body's rotation period, pole and shape remain unknown.

Numbering and naming 

This minor planet has neither been numbered nor named by the Minor Planet Center.

References

External links 
 Bus-sized asteroid 2017 SX17 gives Earth a close shave, Skymania
 Asteroid 2017 SX17 to flyby Earth at 0.23 LD on October 2, The Watchers
 Bus-Size Asteroid Zooms by Earth in Close (But Harmless) Encounter, Space.com
 Asteroid 2017 SX17 close approach, International Asteroid Warning Network (IAWN)
 List Of Apollo Minor Planets (by designation), Minor Planet Center
 
 

Minor planet object articles (unnumbered)
Discoveries by MLS
Near-Earth objects in 2017
20170929